Kirk Jerel Randle (born August 20, 1989), better known by his stage name Kirko Bangz, is an American rapper from Houston, Texas. He is best known for his single, "Drank in My Cup" which was released in 2011 and peaked at number 28 on the US Billboard Hot 100 chart. His name is derived from grunge rock singer Kurt Cobain.

Early life 
Kirko Bangz was born Kirk Jerel Randle in Houston, Texas. Bangz started rapping at the age of fifteen, due in part to witnessing his mother struggle as a single parent; using his mother's pain as motivation. He graduated from North Shore High School in Houston and would later go on to attend Prairie View A&M University where he would major in communications.

Career

2009–2012: Career beginnings and mixtapes 
At Prairie View he was able to focus on his music, and in 2009 he released his first mixtape Procrastination Kills. He got the attention of a fellow student and now manager D Will. His stage name is a play on late singer Kurt Cobain's name. Bangz released his first official single titled "What Yo Name Iz?" on February 7, 2011. His first major hit actually began as a freestyle. It has since peaked at number forty-one on the chart. A remix was released on June 24, 2011, and features Big Sean, Wale and Bun B. He released a mixtape shortly after on March 1, 2011, titled Procrastination Kills 3.

His second single titled "Drank in My Cup" was released on September 16, 2011. During the week of February 25, 2012, the single debuted at number ninety-six on the Billboard Hot 100. It has since peaked at number 28 on the chart and at number one on the Hot Rap Songs chart. The song spawned many remixes and freestyles featuring hip-hop artists J. Cole, 2 Chainz, Tyga, Bow Wow, Kid Ink, Chamillionaire and singer Trey Songz. Bangz released a new mixtape called "Procrastination Kills 4" on September 4, 2012. His third single from his debut album titled "Keep It Trill" was released on November 30, 2012.

2013–present: Atlantic Records and 300 Entertainment 
On March 26, 2013, it was announced that Bangz would be a part of XXL Magazine's 2013 Freshman Class. Three days later he would announce the title of his debut album to be, Bigger Than Me. On July 4, 2013, Bangz announced that he would release another mixtape, Progression 3 on August 1, 2013, prior to his debut album. He has also revealed the cover for the mixtape. However he would announce that it would be pushed back a week later. The mixtape was released on August 12, 2013. Guest appearances came from Wale, Nipsey Hussle, French Montana, Z-Ro, Paul Wall, YG and Slim Thug among others. Production was handled by K.E. on the Track, DJ Mustard and Jahlil Beats among others.

He was moved to Atlantic Records another subsidiarity of Warner Music Group. Then on January 28, 2014, Bangz released the album's first single "Hoe" featuring YG and Yo Gotti. His debut album will be released during 2014 by Atlantic Records. From March 6 to April 17, 2014, Kirko Bangz went on The Trillest concert tour which was co-headlined by frequent collaborator Bun B. On December 16, 2014, Bangz released the Progression V: Young Texas Playa mixtape, which was produced primarily by Austinite Kydd Jones and Sound M.O.B. (who produced Kirko's previous No. 1 hit "Drank in My Cup); the mixtape featured artists such as Texas heavyweights Bun B and Riff Raff. On July 21, 2015, it was announced that Bangz signed with 300 Entertainment. Although he released a few singles to promote his debut album Bigger Than Me, the album would go unreleased. Bangz stated in an interview that some of his unreleased material is owned by Warner Music Group, therefore being unable to release it. On August 31, 2015, Bangz released his first EP titled Fallin' Up Mix. On February 19, 2016, Bangz released his second Extended play, titled Playa Made. Then on August 26, 2016, Bangz released brand new mixtape titled Back Flossin'. On August 10, 2017, Bangz released another mixtape of the Progression series titled Progression 17. He is currently working on a new album titled Soul Food.

Personal life 
Kirko Bangz is of African American, Mexican and Dominican descent.

Discography 

Playa Made (2016)
 Back Flossin (2016)

References

External links 
 Kirko Bangz at YouTube
 Interview with Boi-1da.net

1989 births
Living people
African-American male rappers
American male rappers
American hip hop singers
American rappers of Mexican descent
American rappers of Dominican Republic descent
Atlantic Records artists
Prairie View A&M University alumni
Rappers from Houston
Southern hip hop musicians
Warner Records artists
African-American record producers
American hip hop record producers
Singers from Texas
Songwriters from Texas
North Shore Senior High School (Texas) alumni
21st-century American rappers
Record producers from Texas
21st-century American male musicians
African-American songwriters
21st-century African-American musicians
20th-century African-American people
American male songwriters